Severed may refer to:

Severed, novel by Simon Kernick 2007
Severed, novel Scott Snyder 2012
Severed (film) by Carl Bessai 2005 Canadian zombie horror film 

Severed (video game)
"Severed", song by Mudvayne from L.D. 50  2000	

"Severed", song by Chimaira from Pass Out of Existence, 2001
Severed: The True Story of the Black Dahlia Murder, a 1994 book by John Gilmore

See also 
 Sever (disambiguation)